Frank Mahoney may refer to:

Ike Mahoney (Frank John Mahoney Jr., 1901–1961), American football player
Frank Mahoney (athlete) (born 1929), Bermudian Olympic sprinter
Benjamin Franklin "Frank" Mahoney, American co-founder of the Ryan Airline Company

See also
Frank Mahony (disambiguation)
Francis Mahoney (disambiguation)